Artemy Andreyevich Lebedev is a Russian designer and businessman. He is the founder of the design company Art. Lebedev Studio. He is also an avid blogger, known for his rather provocative views and frequent usage of obscene language.

Early life and career 
Lebedev is the son of the writer and public intellectual Tatyana Tolstaya and a member of the Russian aristocratic Tolstoy family. After one year of studies at Parkville High School, he returned to Moscow, where he graduated from Moscow State School 57. He enrolled at Faculty of Journalism, Moscow State University, but dropped out during his second year. He spent the following years working for a few design studios until 1995 when he founded his own company Art. Lebedev Studio.

According to The Best Travelled Master List, Lebedev is one of the very few people in the world and the only Russian who has travelled to each of the 193 countries of the World.
Artemy visited the Ukrainian city of Mariupol - devastated by Russian shelling - where he took pictures of Mariupol and Zaporizhzhia Nuclear Power Plant, calling the experience 'my life small joys'.

References

1975 births
Living people
Russian designers
Businesspeople from Moscow
Tolstoy family
Russian bloggers
Russian YouTubers
Russian podcasters
Russian atheists
Russian inventors
Businesspeople in computing
Recipients of the Medal of the Order "For Merit to the Fatherland" II class